Deh-e Now-e Kahan (also known as Deh-e Now and Deh Now’īyeh) is a village in Khorramdasht Rural District, in the Central District of Kuhbanan County, Kerman Province, Iran. At the 2006 census, its population was 11, in 4 families.

References 

Populated places in Kuhbanan County